The Tam Điệp pass (Sino-Vietnamese name: Đèo Tam Điệp, demotic folk name: Đèo Ba Dội) is the name of the three passes between ancient Thăng Long and Ninh Bình and Thanh Hóa provinces.

References

Landforms of Ninh Bình province
Mountain passes of Vietnam
Landforms of Thanh Hóa province